Luis Campos may refer to:
Luis María Campos (1838–1907), Argentine general
Luis Carlos Campos Villegas (born 1959), Mexican politician
Luis Campos (athlete) (born 1962), Salvadoran racewalker
Luís Campos (football) (born 1964), Portuguese football manager and director
Luis Campos (musician) (born 1981), Mexican drummer
Luis Henry Campos (born 1995), Peruvian racewalker
Luis M. Campos, Mexican chemistry professor

See also
Carlos Luis Campos (born 1980), Venezuelan boxer
Jorge Luis Campos (born 1990), Paraguayan footballer